Brian Nicolás Mansilla Islas (born 14 May 2002) is a Uruguayan professional footballer who plays as a forward for Peñarol.

Career
Mansilla is a youth academy product of Peñarol. He was part of club's under-20 team which won 2022 U-20 Copa Libertadores.

Mansilla made his professional debut for Peñarol on 1 April 2022 in a goalless league draw against Rentistas.

Career statistics

Honours
Peñarol U20
U-20 Copa Libertadores: 2022

References

External links
 

2002 births
Living people
Association football forwards
Uruguayan footballers
Uruguayan Primera División players
Peñarol players